Said Alievich Aliev (born 3 December 1998) is a Russian football player. He plays for FC SKA-Khabarovsk.

Club career
He made his debut in the Russian Professional Football League for FC Anzhi-2 Makhachkala on 19 July 2017 in a game against FC Chernomorets Novorossiysk.

He made his Russian Football National League debut for FC Luch Vladivostok on 7 July 2019 in a game against FC Khimki. He came on as a substitute late in the first half and scored twice in a 2–5 loss.

On 11 January 2020 Aliev moved to FC Nizhny Novgorod.

In February 2021, he moved to Russian Premier League club FC Tambov. However, after making just one appearance for the club in a Russian Cup game, he moved to FC Krymteplytsia Molodizhne.

References

External links
 
 Profile by Russian Professional Football League
 

1998 births
Footballers from Makhachkala
Living people
Russian footballers
Association football forwards
FC Anzhi Makhachkala players
FC Luch Vladivostok players
FC Nizhny Novgorod (2015) players
FC Veles Moscow players
FC Tambov players
FC Krymteplytsia Molodizhne players
FC Chayka Peschanokopskoye players
FC SKA-Khabarovsk players
Russian First League players
Russian Second League players
Crimean Premier League players